Provortex is a genus of flatworms belonging to the family Provorticidae.

The species of this genus are found in Europe.

Species:
 Provortex affinis (Jensen, 1878) 
 Provortex balticus (Schultze, 1851)

References

Platyhelminthes